Shere is a residential area to the east of Pretoria, South Africa. It lies wedged between the Bronberg and Magaliesberg mountains.

References

Suburbs of Pretoria